Siergot Sully (born 27 February 1951) is a former boxer from Haiti, who competed in the light welterweight (- 63.5 kg) division at the 1976 Summer Olympics. Sully lost his opening bout to Ismael Martinez of Puerto Rico.

References

1951 births
Living people
Light-welterweight boxers
Olympic boxers of Haiti
Boxers at the 1976 Summer Olympics
Haitian male boxers